The Stade François Coty is a football stadium in the Corsican city of Ajaccio, France, and the home of AC Ajaccio. Its capacity is 10,660.

The stadium was inaugurated on 1 December 1969 under the name Parc des Sports de l'ACA. A crowd of 14,421 was in attendance to see AC Ajaccio defeat SC Bastia in the Corsican derby. Known informally as Timizzolu, the stadium was renovated in 2002 and renamed after François Coty (1874–1934), a businessman and far-right politician from Ajaccio. Since 2007, the stadium has undergone substantial improvements to enable it to host Ligue 1 matches.

References

External links
Stade François Coty at AC Ajaccio
Stadium Guide Article

AC Ajaccio
Football venues in France
Sports venues in Corse-du-Sud
Sports venues completed in 1968